The Leighton House Museum is an art museum in the Holland Park area of the Royal Borough of Kensington and Chelsea in west London.

The building was the London home of painter Frederic Leighton, 1st Baron Leighton (1830–1896), who commissioned the architect and designer George Aitchison to build him a combined home and studio noted for its incorporation of tiles and other elements purchased in the Near East to build a magnificent Qa'a (room). The resulting building, completed between 1866 and 1895 on the privately owned Ilchester Estate, is now Grade II* listed. It is noted for its elaborate Orientalist and aesthetic interiors.

The house
The museum has been open to the public since 1929.  In 1958 the London County Council commemorated Leighton with a blue plaque at the museum. The museum was awarded the European Union Prize for Cultural Heritage / Europa Nostra Award in 2012. It is open daily except Tuesdays, and is a companion museum to 18 Stafford Terrace, another Victorian artist's home in Kensington.

Design and construction

Aitchison designed the first part of the house (2 Holland Park Road, later renumbered as 12) in 1864, although Leighton was not granted a lease on the land until April 1866. Building commenced shortly afterwards, and the house, which cost £4500, was ready for occupation by the end of the year. The building is of red Suffolk bricks with Caen Stone dressings in a restrained Classical style.

The architect extended the building over 30 years; the first phase was only three windows wide. The main room was the first floor studio, facing north, originally 45 by 25 feet, with a large central window to provide plenty of light for painting. There was also a gallery at the east end and a separate staircase for use by models. The house was extended to the east in 1869–70. Additionally, a major extension was made in 1877-79: the two-storey "Arab Hall", built to house Leighton's collection of tiles collected during visits to the Middle East.

According to Aitchison and Walter Crane, the design was based on the palace of La Zisa in Palermo. The 17th-century tiles are complemented by carved wooden lattice-work windows of the same period from Damascus. There are also large 16th-century Turkish tiles. The west wall has a wooden alcove with inset 14th-century tiles.

The room also contains Victorian elements. The capitals of the smaller columns are by Sir Joseph Boehm, from Aitchison's designs. The capitals of the large columns, gilded and carved in the shape of birds, are by Randolph Caldecot. The mosaic frieze was designed by Walter Crane. The marble work was by George P. White. Elaborate decorative paintwork adorns the domed ceiling  and in the centre of the floor there is a fountain. The tiles in the passage to the Arab Hall are by William De Morgan.

In 1889 an additional winter studio was added to the building. The final addition by Aitchison was the top-lit picture gallery in 1895. After Leighton died in 1896, the contents of the house were sold, including at least one thousand of his own drawings, almost all of which were bought by the Fine Art Society. In 1927 Mrs Henry Perrin offered to pay for additional gallery space. The building was extended to the designs of Halsey Ricardo and the Perrin Galleries opened in 1929. This extension was in memory of Mrs Perrin's daughter Muriel Ida Perrin, an artist and sculptor who had trained at the Royal College of Art and worked for the catalogue section of the Aircraft Manufacturing Company (Airco) during the First World War.

Permanent collection

The museum has on permanent display works of art by various members of the Pre-Raphaelite Brotherhood, including John Everett Millais, Edward Burne-Jones and George Frederic Watts, as well as 81 oil paintings by Leighton himself.

Some of the most notable oil paintings by Leighton in the collection are:

 The Death of Brunelleschi – 1852
 Charles Edward Perugini – 1855
 A Noble Lady of Venice – c. 1865
 Hercules Wrestling with Death for the Body of Alcestes – 1869–1871
 Clytemnestra from the Battlements of Argos Watches for the Beacon Fires Which Are to Announce the Return of Agamemnon – c. 1874
 Professor Giovanni Costa – 1878
 The Countess of Brownlow – c. 1878–79
 The Vestal – c. 1882–83
 Alexandra Sutherland Orr (née Leighton) – 1890
 And the sea gave up the dead which were in it – c. 1891–92

Other works by Leighton in the collection include:

 5 albums and sketchbooks of drawings and watercolours.
 27 watercolours.
 54 prints of Leighton's works.
 14 items of personal material including documents, personal mementos, embroideries, enamels and caricatures.
 several small-scale sculptures, including Athlete Strangling a Python (1874) and Needless Alarms (1887).
 a portrait of Anna Risi

Works in the collection not by Leighton include:

 Antonio Rossellino's carved and coloured relief Madonna of the Candleabra, which had been in Leighton's collection, sold after his death and re-acquired by the museum in 2006.
 G. F. Watts's portrait of Frederic Leighton.
 Luke Fildes's still life and study for The Widower.
 Sir Alfred Gilbert's original sketch model for Eros.

In 2016 Leighton's famous painting Flaming June was loaned to the museum, and was displayed in the studio in which it was created.

Works in the permanent collection

Council arts strategy
The building is run by Kensington and Chelsea Borough Council. In 2009 Nicholas Paget-Brown launched the Cultural Placemaking initiative  as part of the council's Arts and Culture Policy. He explained that the plan was to build on the work of Opera Holland Park and Leighton House Museum to develop a broader coherent strategy to encourage developers to consider the council's creative and artistic ambitions when working on a development project.

In popular culture

The house's pseudo-Islamic court has featured as a set in various film and television programs, such as Nicholas Nickleby (2002), Brazil (1985) and an episode of the drama series Spooks, as well as the music video for the songs "Golden Brown" by The Stranglers and "Gold" by Spandau Ballet.

See also
Holland Park Circle
List of single-artist museums

References

Sources

Further reading
 Volume 1, Volume 2
 
Robbins, Daniel. (2011) Leighton House Museum Kensington and Chelsea Borough Council (KCBC) 
Robbins, Daniel and Dakers, Caroline. (2011) George Aitchison: Leighton's architect revealed (KCBC) 
Various. (2010) Closer to Home: The Restoration of Leighton House and Catalogue of the Reopening Displays 2010 (KCBC)

External links

 Leighton House Museum at the Royal Borough of Kensington and Chelsea website

1929 establishments in England
Art museums and galleries in London
Art museums established in 1929
Artists' studios in London
Biographical museums in London
Decorative arts museums in England
Grade II* listed buildings in the Royal Borough of Kensington and Chelsea
Grade II* listed houses in London
Grade II* listed museum buildings
Historic house museums in London
Holland Park
Houses in the Royal Borough of Kensington and Chelsea
Museums in the Royal Borough of Kensington and Chelsea
Museums devoted to one artist
Moorish Revival architecture in the United Kingdom
History of the Royal Borough of Kensington and Chelsea